Jeffrie E. Long Jr. (born November 12, 1996) is an American politician who is a member of the Maryland House of Delegates for District 27B in Calvert and Prince George's counties in Maryland.

Background
Long graduated from Huntingtown High School and later attended Liberty University, where he earned a Bachelors of Arts degree in clinical psychology. He is currently the pastor at Communion Church in Huntingtown, Maryland. Long previously served as a legislative aide to then-President of the Maryland Senate Thomas V. Miller Jr. and state senators Joanne C. Benson and Michael Jackson.

In 2020, Long was elected as a Democratic National Convention delegate, pledged to Joe Biden, with 19.5 percent of the vote.

In February 2021, Long applied to fill a vacancy in the Maryland House of Delegates left by the appointment of state delegate Michael Jackson to the Maryland Senate. The Prince George's County Democratic Committee nominated Jacqueline Steele-McCall to fill the vacancy, but the Calvert County Democratic Central Committee picked Rachel Jones to fill the vacancy. Jones was ultimately appointed to the seat by Governor Larry Hogan on February 17, 2021. Long challenged Jones' incumbency in the 2022 Maryland House of Delegates election, defeating her in the Democratic primary with 54.3 percent of the vote. He faced no opposition in the general election.

In the legislature
Long was sworn into the Maryland House of Delegates on January 11, 2023. He and Joe Vogel are the first Gen-Z members of the Maryland General Assembly. He is a member of the House Environment and Transportation Committee.

Political positions
Long has described himself as a "fiscal conservative". During his House of Delegates candidacy, Long campaigned on topics such as women's rights, making schools safer, fixing the state's transportation system, and making Maryland more retiree-friendly.

Electoral history

References

1996 births
21st-century African-American politicians
21st-century American politicians
African-American state legislators in Maryland
African-American men in politics
Democratic Party members of the Maryland House of Delegates
Living people
Liberty University alumni